The John Marshall Journal of Information Technology and Privacy Law is a law review published by a student group at the John Marshall Law School (Chicago). it covers international information technology and privacy law. The journal was cited by a recent decision of the Supreme Court of the United States in Quanta Computer, Inc. v. LG Electronics, Inc.

History
The journal was originally established as the Software Law Journal by Michael D. Scott. In 1987, Scott invited the John Marshall Law School to assume editorial control of the journal, because of the school's commitment to education in the area of information technology law. In 1994, Scott then invited the school to merge the Software Law Journal with the Computer Law Journal, and to assume editorial control and publishing rights of the new journal.

External links
 
 Journal sample
 Chicago law firms

American law journals
Quarterly journals
Publications established in 1988
English-language journals
Works about computer law